The World Future Council (WFC) is a German non-profit foundation with its headquarters in Hamburg. It works to pass on a healthy and sustainable planet with just and peaceful societies to future generations.

FuturePolicy.org 

The website futurepolicy.org website presents political solutions and assists decision-makers in developing and implementing future just policies. It is an online database designed for policy-makers to simplify the sharing of existing and proven policy solutions to tackle the world's most fundamental and urgent problems. It now contains policies, for example on renewable energies, energy efficiency, sustainable cities and food production in the era of climate change, that have been promoted in WFC publications, films and hearings.

Research and publications
Miguel Mendonça, David Jacobs and Benjamin K. Sovacool (2009). Powering the Green Economy: The Feed-In Tariff Handbook, Earthscan, 
Herbert Girardet and Miguel Mendonça (2009). A Renewable World: Energy, Ecology, Equality, Green Books, 
Herbert Girardet (editor) (2008). Surviving the Century: Facing Climate Chaos and Other Global Challenges, Earthscan, 
Herbert Girardet (2008). Cities People Planet: Liveable Cities for a Sustainable World, Wiley, 
Miguel Mendonça (2007). Feed-in Tariffs: Accelerating the deployment of renewable energy, Earthscan, 
Jakob von Uexkull and Herbert Girardet (2005). Shaping our Future: Creating the World Future Council, Green Books / World Future Council Initiative,

See also 
 Futures studies

References

External links
 World Future Council

Human rights organisations based in Germany
Nature conservation organisations based in Europe
Peace organisations based in Germany
Organisations based in Hamburg
Renewable energy economy